The term dry sex may refer to:
 dry sex, the cultural practice of drying and tightening the vagina prior to sexual intercourse
 Non-penetrative sex, a sexual activity which does not involve penetration
 frotteurism